Sasolburgh High School is a public high school, serving grades 8 to 12, in the town of Sasolburg, South Africa.

Facilities 
Sasolburg High School was the first school with a language lab, and also the first to have a learning lab in South Africa.

The school offers several sports, including hockey, netball, and rugby football, and a traditional local rivalry is maintained with Technical High School Sasolburg, often abbreviated as HTS. The school tends to focus more on hockey and rugby football, as a result, in late 2019 to early 2020 the school spent an estimated total of R6 million on an artificial hockey turf.

Firearm Incident 
On 20 September 2013 a 15 year old student brought a firearm to school, belonged to his grandfather, and began threatening other students. While attempting to intervene a male teacher was wounded in the right leg after the gun fired by mistake. Having fled, the student was later found with the firearm in his possession. The teacher was taken to a nearby hospital in a stable condition and underwent surgery at Vanderbijlpark's Mediclinic Emfuleni. The pupil was arrested and psychologically evaluated before appearing in the child justice court on 23 September. He was later released and placed in the care of his parents.

Notable alumni
 Johannes Kerkorrel – singer/songwriter
 Mark Pilgrim - Radio DJ, TV personality

References

External links
  - Official website of Sasolburg High School

High schools in South Africa
Sasolburg
Schools in the Free State (province)